The 2017–18 Winthrop Eagles women's basketball team represents Winthrop University during the 2017–18 NCAA Division I women's basketball season. The Eagles, led by first year head coach Lynette Woodard, play their home games at the Winthrop Coliseum and were members of the Big South Conference. They finished the season 3–27, 2–16 in Big South play to finish in last place. They lost in the first round of the Big South women's basketball tournament to Gardner–Webb.

Roster

Schedule

|-
!colspan=9 style=| Non-conference regular season

|-
!colspan=9 style=| Big South Regular season

|-
!colspan=9 style=| Big South tournament

See also
 2017–18 Winthrop Eagles men's basketball team

References

Winthrop
Winthrop Eagles women's basketball seasons